Tarsonops systematicus is a species of true spider in the family Caponiidae. It is found in Mexico.

References

Caponiidae
Articles created by Qbugbot
Spiders described in 1924